Fariba Hajamadi (born Isfahan, Iran 1957) is an Iranian American artist whose work employs photography and painting on fabric, canvas, and wood panels, often presented as large scale installations. Her work investigates cultural and gender Identity, as well as narratives of displacement. A pioneer in the exploration of the representation of the “other”, Hajamadi dissects the cultural institution from the point of view of the cultural outsider both as a woman and as someone born in a non-Western culture.

Fariba Hajamadi lives and works in New York City.

Background 
Fariba Hajamadi left her native country of Iran in 1976, to pursue Fine Arts studies and received her BFA in painting from Western Michigan University. Hajamadi subsequently received her MFA at the California Institute of the Arts(Cal Arts), studying under Jonathan Borofsky and first generation conceptual artists John Baldessari, Michael Asher. Her fellow students included Ashley Bickerton, Christopher Williams, Kate Ericson, Mel Ziegler and Bill Wurtz.

Artwork 
The starting point, for Hajamadi, is her photographs of the interiors of institutions devoted to the preservation of art and culture. Her large scale works are a seamless collage made by compositing multiple layers of photographs, of the same location from different vantage points or by combining different locations. A new interior with a forced symmetry and perspective allows the viewer to see an interior from the center and the periphery at the same time. Her architectural interiors are fictional, dense with meaning, and have a quality of displacement that verges on the surreal. Her work where the line between photography and painting are blurred engages the viewer in a discourse on cultural identities, representation of the female, photography and historical truths. Since the 1980s, Fariba Hajamadi has been producing artworks that set out to diagram and re-construct the Western narrative of the “Other". Her use of such critical tactics began before they had entered the mainstream of contemporary artistic practice. Hajamadi began by examining the museum as the locus of Occidental civilization's reading of non-Western forms and practices. Hajamadi tacitly declared it to be something like the scene of a perpetual crime against humanity, insofar as it enshrines the trophies of a deep cultural misunderstanding.

In her site specific installations Hajamadi created a series of wallpapers, reminiscent of toile de Jouy, with four themes Hunt, War, Eros and Rape... Hajamadi has developed a unique art practice; a hybrid of photography, painting and installation, that endeavors to invent a relationship to the slippery conditions of autobiography. She stretches the parameters of photography to achieve work of profound emotional resonance. One of the most powerful qualities of Hajamadi's work has been its psychological weight, which channels the mind's eye into her charged spaces.

Exhibition 
Fariba Hajamadi has exhibited her work and installations in the United States and  internationally since mid 1980s. Some of her solo exhibitions include: Musée de La Roche-sur-Yon, ICA Philadelphia, Queens Museum. Rhona Hoffman Gallery Chicago, Christine Burgin New York, Gallerie Laage-Salomon, Paris Maureen Paley London.

Group exhibitions 
Hajamadi has participated in numerous group exhibitions throughout her career. Some of these include:

 Departure Lounge, MoMA PS1, New York
 Fake, The New Museum, New York
 Transmute, Museum of Contemporary Art, Chicago
 L’Hiver de l’Amour, MAM/ARC Musée d’Art Moderne de Paris
 Echolot, Museum Fridericianum, Kassel, Germany
 Strange Home, Museum August Kestner, Hannover, Germany
 Remote Connections, Wäinö Aaltonen Museum of Art, Turku, Finland
 Ecbatana,  Nikolaj Copenhagen Contemporary Art Center, Copenhagen, Denmark 
 Remote Connections, Neue Galerie Graz, Austria
 ORIENT/ATION, Fourth Biennial of Istanbul, Istanbul, Turkey
 Altrove fra immagine e identità, Museo d'Arte Contemporanea, Prato

Literature 
Ulla Angkjær Jørgensen, Exploring the Black Venus Figure in Aesthetic Practices, . p178-182
Dan Cameron, Reconciling Opposites, Museum Fridericianum, Kassel, Germany. . 32 p.
Joshua Decter, Fariba Hajamadi: The Invention of Disappearance, Musée de La Roche-sur-Yon, France . 18 p.
Joshua Decter, The Invisible Mirror of Memory, Galeries Magazine No36 APR/MAY 1990. 108-109
Gary Indiana Fariba Hajamadi, ICA, Philadelphia 
Chris Dercon, A Different corner, Museo de Arte Moderno, Cuenca, Ecuador
Rosetta Brooks, Fariba Hajamadi: 20/20 Vision, CEPA Journal, Winter

References

External links 
Fariba Hajamadi website
Gabrielle Salomon Art Conseil
Fariba Hajamadi romanovgrave.com

1957 births
Living people
20th-century Iranian women artists
Artists from Isfahan
Western Michigan University alumni
California College of the Arts alumni
Artists from New York City
Iranian emigrants to the United States